Shaun Fourie (born 28 August 1973) is a South African cricketer. He played in eleven first-class matches for Border from 1993/94 to 1996/97.

See also
 List of Border representative cricketers

References

External links
 

1973 births
Living people
South African cricketers
Border cricketers
Cricketers from East London, Eastern Cape